Hobart M. Stocking (April 28, 1846 – August 6, 1920) was a member of the Wisconsin State Assembly.

Biography
Stocking was born in Canton, New York on April 28, 1846. He attended what was then Galesville University. During the American Civil War, he was a captain with the 48th Wisconsin Volunteer Infantry Regiment of the Union Army and was a commander of Mound City's post. He married a woman 30 years his junior in the 1890s, but divorced  in 1898. Stocking died in Saint Paul, Minnesota on August 6, 1920.

Political career
Stocking was a member of the Assembly during the 1876 and 1889 sessions. Previously, he had been Receiver of the U.S. Land Office of Eau Claire, Wisconsin from 1869 to 1873. He was a Republican.

References

External links

Politicians from Eau Claire, Wisconsin
Republican Party members of the Wisconsin State Assembly
Gale College alumni
People of Wisconsin in the American Civil War
Union Army officers
1846 births
1920 deaths
Burials in Wisconsin